UNGP may refer to:

 United Nations Guiding Principles on Business and Human Rights
 United Nations Global Pulse
 United Nations Global Platform